Åke Henrik Gartz (9 June  1888 in Helsinki – 29 November 1974 in Karis) was a Finnish politician. He served as Minister of Trade and Industry in the  J. K. Paasikivi II and III Cabinet from 1944 to 1946, and in the Kekkonen I and II Cabinet as Minister of Foreign Affairs from 1950 to 1951.

Gartz was an Independent politician  and did not represent any party, but was counted close to the Swedish People's Party.

Gartz graduated as a Bachelor of Philosophy in 1909 and a Bachelor of Law in 1914. He received the honorary title in 1917.

As Minister Gartz came from industry and employers' organizations; He was Deputy Director of A. Ahlström since 1931  and Chairman of the Board of Directors of Finnish Association of  Employers.

After his ministry, Gartz served as Envoy of Finland in Bern 1951–1953 and in Bucharest and Moscow from 1953 to 1955 (1954–1955 as Ambassador).

Åke Gartz received the honorary title of Vuorineuvos in 1940.

References

1888 births
1974 deaths
Burials at Hietaniemi Cemetery
Politicians from Helsinki
People from Uusimaa Province (Grand Duchy of Finland)
Swedish-speaking Finns
Finnish people of German descent
Ministers of Trade and Industry of Finland
Ministers for Foreign Affairs of Finland
Ambassadors of Finland to the Soviet Union
Businesspeople from Helsinki
20th-century Finnish businesspeople